Sabbia, Sabine is a frazione of Varallo in the Province of Vercelli in the Italian region Piedmont, located about  northeast of Turin and about  north of Vercelli.

Sabbia borders the following municipalities: San Vigilio, Valstrona, and Varallo Sesia.

Demographic evolution

References

Cities and towns in Piedmont